Emmanuel College is the theological college of Victoria University in the University of Toronto. Affiliated with the United Church of Canada, it is also a member institution of the Toronto School of Theology. The college's principal is HyeRan Kim-Cragg.

Emmanuel College is a member of the Association of Theological Schools in the United States and Canada.

History

Emmanuel College has its origins in Victoria College, a Methodist college founded in 1836. From 1871 it operated a Faculty of Theology training candidates for the ministry of the Wesleyan Methodist Church. In 1884, with the merger of the Wesleyan Methodists and the Methodist Episcopal Church (MEC) into a single Methodist Church of Canada, the seminary the MEC had established at Albert University in 1857 merged into Victoria.

When the merger in turn to create the United Church of Canada took place in 1925, a number of congregations in the Presbyterian Church in Canada chose to remain a distinct denomination. Knox College, University of Toronto, founded as the Free Church rival to Queen's during the Disruption of 1843 and favourable to church union, was expected to serve as the new church's main seminary. However, the Legislative Assembly of Ontario awarded the building to the continuing Presbyterians. The faculty and most students of Knox left to form "Union College" with the Faculty of Theology at Victoria. Shortly renamed Emmanuel College, the new college became affiliated with the University of Toronto as a United Church of Canada seminary in 1925. The Emmanuel College main building was designed by architect Henry Sproatt.

In 1969 the Toronto School of Theology (TST) was created as an independent federation of 7 schools of theology, including the divinity faculties of Emmanuel College. Within its own federation, U of T granted all but theology or divinity degrees. In May 1974, along with the other federated universities, St. Michael's and Trinity, a Memorandum of Understanding was signed with the University of Toronto, establishing the terms of their new relationship with the Faculty of Arts and Science. Since 1978, by virtue of a change made in its charter, the University of Toronto has granted theology degrees conjointly with Emmanuel College and other TST's member institutions.

Emmanuel College welcomed its first woman principal in 2018 with the appointment of Michelle Voss Roberts. In 2022, HyeRan Kim-Cragg succeeded Voss Roberts as principal. Rev. Kim-Cragg is the first person of colour and second woman to lead the institution.

Popular culture
Emmanuel College's library was the location where the British band Tears for Fears filmed the music video for their song "Head over Heels" in June 1985.

References

 Kenneth H. Cousland. The Founding of Emmanuel College of Victoria University of the University of Toronto. University of Toronto Press, 1978.
 Martin L. Friedland. The University of Toronto: A History University of Toronto Press, 2002.

External links
 

Seminaries and theological colleges in Canada
University of Toronto
Methodist seminaries and theological colleges
University of Toronto buildings
Educational institutions established in 1928
1928 establishments in Ontario